The Yorkshire Universities Air Squadron (more commonly known as YUAS) is a Royal Air Force flying training unit that currently operates out of RAF Leeming in North Yorkshire, England. One of fourteen University Air Squadrons, the unit traditionally recruits students from universities across the Yorkshire and Humber region and provides bursaries for those who wish to pursue a career in the Royal Air Force.

History
YUAS was formed in 1969 when the University Air Squadron (UAS) from Hull and the UAS from Leeds, were combined to make YUAS. Leeds UAS was formed in January 1941 and had been allocated to airfields at Sherburn-in-Elmet and RAF Yeadon. Whilst at Yeadon, the squadron represented the final RAF presence when the airfield had gone over to a commercial operation as (what is now) Leeds Bradford Airport. Hull UAS was formed at RAF Driffield, but flew out of Leconfield and Brough. With the amalgamation of the two squadrons in 1969, flying was retained at RAF Leconfield for students from Hull University. As a formed squadron, YUAS first flew from RAF Church Fenton between 1969 and 1975. 

The Queen approved the badge for the squadron in 1972; the blazon depicts a Yorkshire white rose with an open book on top of it. The rose represents Yorkshire, and the book represents the universities of the county. In July 1976, two Bulldog aircraft from the squadron were damaged over Southport beach in north west England. One aircraft went into a spin from which the aircrew could not recover, and both pilot and instructor bailed out, with the instructor's parachute opening just before he hit the ground, which resulted in spinal damage. The student pilot was unhurt. Another aircraft landed on the beach to check on the bailed-out crew, and this second aircraft flipped over in the mud. All aircrew survived.

When Church Fenton was placed under a care and maintenance programme as a Relief Landing Ground (RLG) for RAF Linton-on-Ouse, the squadron moved to RAF Finningley in 1975. It returned to a resurgent Church Fenton in 1995 when RAF Finningley was closed.

YUAS is one of fourteen University Air Squadrons that are spread out across Great Britain and it recruits from the universities at Bradford, Huddersfield, Hull, Leeds, Sheffield and York, with about 30 new intakes every year. Alongside the original universities that were listed for YUAS, students from Sheffield Hallam, Leeds College of Music, Leeds Metropolitan University and York St John University, can also apply to join YUAS. Students who join YUAS are enlisted as Officer Cadets in the Royal Air Force Volunteer Reserve and receive 30 hours of flying training annually.

In 1998, a contract was signed to replace the Bulldog trainer aircraft with the Grob G115 (Tutor). A private company, Vosper Thorneycroft, were contracted to supply maintenance on the aircraft through a private contract. The Tutor aircraft was delivered to the University Air Squadrons from July 1999 onwards.

In 2013, it was announced that RAF Church Fenton would be closing down and that all units would need to be transferred elsewhere. In 2014, a year after moving to Linton-on-Ouse, YUAS won the best University Air Squadron beating 13 other University Air Squadrons across Great Britain.

Due to the closure of RAF Linton-on-Ouse in 2021, YUAS relocated to RAF Leeming on 1 December 2020. An announcement was made on that day that YUAS would operate alongside Northumbrian Universities Air Squadron at RAF Leeming.

Locations
March 1969 – August 1975: RAF Church Fenton
August 1975 – October 1995: RAF Finningley
October 1995 – August 2013: RAF Church Fenton
August 2013 – December 2020: RAF Linton-on-Ouse
December 2020 – present: RAF Leeming

References

Sources

External links
YUAS Badge on RAF Heraldry Trust website

Hambleton District
Military units and formations in the North Riding of Yorkshire
Military units and formations established in 1969
Organisations based in North Yorkshire
Royal Air Force university air squadrons
Universities in Yorkshire